Franciszek Bunsch (born 9 August 1926) is a Polish painter and graphic artist, representative of the Krakow school of workshop graphics, specializing in the metaphorical vision of reality. A longtime lecturer and professor at the Academy of Fine Arts in Krakow. Son of painter, Adam Bunsch and younger brother of the set designer Ali Bunsch.

Bunsch also illustrated books and did graphic design for publications, preparing such items as: series of woodcuts for J. de la Madelène's "Pan na Piaskowy Zamku" (which won 2nd prize at the 2nd National Exhibition of Books and Illustrations, Warsaw 1955) and "Ballads and romances"  Mickiewicza (awarded a distinction at the National Competition for illustrations to the works of Adam Mickiewicz, Warsaw 1956), Tadeusz Kudliński, "The mask and the face of the theatre" (1963, with his wife, a painter Krystyna Bunsch-Gruchalska), as well as illustrating the ancient trilogy Olimpias, Parmenion, Aleksander with Karol Bunsch.
In the years 1960-1980 he designed a series of playing cards, printed on a large scale by Krakowskie Zakłady Wyrobów Papierowych (currently the Trefl Playing Card Company), which then became part of the canon of Polish card designs.

References

Bibliography
 175 lat nauczania malarstwa, rzeźby i grafiki w krakowskiej Akademii Sztuk Pięknych, wyd. Oficyna Artystów „Sztuka”, Kraków 1994, pp. 130, 147, 150, 155–157, 308, 351, 368, 397. Na książce  .
 Kunstgewerbeschule 1939-1943 i Podziemny Teatr Niezależny Tadeusza Kantora w latach 1942-1944, wyd. Cricoteca, Kraków 2007, pp. 5–16, 65, 83. 
 A. Toborowicz, Grafika ASP Kraków, wyd. ASP, Kraków 2013, s. 44–45. 
 83 lata pracowni liternictwa i typografii w ASP w Krakowie, wyd. ASP, Kraków 2012, pp. 11, 15. 
 F. Bunsch, A. Pasicki, Z. Jeżo, Pracownia Drzeworytu ASP w Krakowie: notatki z przeszłości, wyd. ASP, Kraków 1988.
 J. Madeyski, Malarstwo Franciszka Bunscha, [w:] Franciszek Bunsch. Grafiki - tempery, TPSP, Kraków 2001, pp. 11–14. 
 Wielość w jedności - Drzeworyt polski po 1900 roku. Materiały z sesji naukowej, red. naukowa: B. Chojnacka, M. F. Woźniak, wyd. Muzeum Okręgowe im. L. Wyczółkowskiego w Bydgoszczy, Bydgoszcz 2009, pp. 12, 5–19, 146, 155, 157. 
 
 VII Międzynarodowy Przegląd Ekslibrisu Drzeworytniczego i Linorytniczego im. P. Stellera (katalog), Katowice 2010, pp. 10, 14–15. 
 Książki autorskie Franciszka Bunscha, (AN), „Dziennik Polski", 22.01.2008.
 P. Taranczewski, F. Bunsch, Życie na niby, malowanie na serio, „Wiadomości ASP” no. 50, 06.2010, pp. 10–22.
 J. Bończa-Szabłowski, Finezja mistrza miedziorytu, „Rzeczpospolita", 29.04.2014.
 W. Krupiński, Profesor Franciszek Bunsch: Znaleźć własną postawę i siłę, „Dziennik Polski”, 19–20.09.2015. [dostęp 2018-04-22]
 M. Sołtysik, Franciszek Bunsch mistrz świadomego rytu, „Kraków” 2015, nr 9, pp. 72–73.
 Franciszek Bunsch - rysunek a grafika, Międzynarodowe Triennale Grafiki Kraków-2015. [dostęp 2015-10-08]
 Sygnowano: Bunsch - malarstwo, grafika, rzeźba, teatr, literatura, (katalog), Szczecin 2016.
 
 J. Bończa-Szabłowski, Wielka planeta Bunsch, „Rzeczpospolita”, 22.04.2016. [dostęp 2018-04-22]
 P. Taranczewski, Wspominając Akademię: napisane, wysłuchane, zapisane, wyd. ASP, Kraków, 2017, s. 9, 362–379, 380–401. 
 Prezentacje. Franciszek Bunsch, „Pro Libris” nos. 1-2 (62-63), 2018. [dostęp 2018-04-22]
 Franciszek Bunsch: grafika, rysunek, malarstwo, red. F. Bunsch, J. Gościej-Lewińska, NCK, Kraków 2018. 
 S. Tabisz, W nastroju poezji… O twórczości malarskiej, rysunkowej i graficznej Franciszka Bunscha, „Wiadomości ASP” nr 85, 2019, pp. 80–83.

1926 births
Living people
Jan Matejko Academy of Fine Arts alumni
Academic staff of the Jan Matejko Academy of Fine Arts
People from Bielsko
Polish printmakers